Loxostege turbidalis is a species of moth in the family Crambidae. It was described by Treitschke in 1829. It is found in most of Europe, except Ireland, Great Britain, Norway, the Benelux and the Iberian Peninsula. It has also been recorded from Russia, Turkey, China and Japan.

Adults are on wing in June and July.

The larvae feed on Artemisia species.

Subspecies
Loxostege turbidalis turbidalis
Loxostege turbidalis inornatalis Leech, 1889 (Japan)

References

Moths described in 1829
Moths of Europe
Moths of Asia
Pyraustinae
Taxa named by Georg Friedrich Treitschke